Little Rock is an unincorporated community in Knox County, Indiana, in the United States.

History
A post office called Littlerock was opened in 1901, and it remained in operation until it was discontinued in 1903.

References

Unincorporated communities in Knox County, Indiana
Unincorporated communities in Indiana